Charles Egon may refer to:

 Charles Egon II, Prince of Fürstenberg (1796–1854)
 Charles Egon III, Prince of Fürstenberg (1820–1892)
 Charles Egon IV, Prince of Fürstenberg (1852–1896)